Sarah Stone may refer to:

Sarah Stone (midwife), 18th-century English midwife and author
Sarah Stone (artist) (1760–1844), English natural-history illustrator and painter
Sarah Stone (tennis) (born 1982), Australian tennis player and coach
Sarah Stone, contestant on the eighth season of US reality dating show The Bachelor
Sarah Stone, contestant on the sixth season of Australian reality talent show The Voice Australia